Jesusemilore Talodabijesu "Semi" Ojeleye (born December 5, 1994) is a Nigerian-American professional basketball player for Virtus Bologna of the Italian Lega Basket Serie A (LBA) and the EuroLeague. He played college basketball for both Duke University and Southern Methodist University.

Early life and college career
Ojeleye's parents emigrated from Nigeria to Ottawa, Kansas. He starred at Ottawa High School and in 2013 was named the Parade Magazine National Player of the Year. He chose national power Duke for college, but played sparingly for two seasons. Looking for a larger role, he transferred to SMU, and in 2016–17 he led the team to both American Athletic Conference (AAC) regular season and Tournament Championships. Ojeleye averaged 18.9 points and 6.8 rebounds per game and was named AAC Player of the Year.

Professional career

Boston Celtics (2017–2021)
Following the close of his redshirt junior season, Ojeleye entered his name for the 2017 NBA draft but did not hire an agent, leaving open the possibility of a return to the Mustangs. Ojeleye was invited to the 2017 NBA Draft Combine, one of 67 participants. After some promising performances he announced that he would commit to the draft, ending his college career. Ojeleye was chosen by the Boston Celtics in the second round with the 37th overall pick.

Ojeleye made his professional debut on October 17, 2017, in a 102–99 loss to the Cleveland Cavaliers. During the regular season, he averaged 2.7 points per game and shot 34.6 percent from the field, but emerged as a defensive presence. He started in Game 5 of the playoff series versus the Milwaukee Bucks and held Giannis Antetokounmpo to 16 points.

Milwaukee Bucks (2021–2022)
On August 6, 2021, Ojeleye signed with the Milwaukee Bucks on a one-year, veteran's minimum contract.

Los Angeles Clippers (2022)
On February 10, 2022, Ojeleye was traded to the Los Angeles Clippers as part of a four-team trade. On March 26, he was waived.

Virtus Bologna (2022–present)
On July 28, 2022, Ojeleye signed a two-year deal with Virtus Bologna of the Italian Lega Basket Serie A (LBA) and the EuroLeague. On 29 September 2022, after having ousted Olimpia Milano in the semifinals, Virtus won its third Supercup, defeating 72–69 Banco di Sardegna Sassari and achieving a back-to-back, following the 2021 trophy. Ojeleye was nominated MVP of the competition.

Career statistics

NBA

Regular season

|-
| style="text-align:left;"|
| style="text-align:left;"|Boston
| 73 || 0 || 15.8 || .346 || .320 || .610 || 2.2 || .3 || .3 || .1 || 2.7
|-
| style="text-align:left;"|
| style="text-align:left;"|Boston
| 56 || 3 || 10.6 || .424 || .315 || .615 || 1.5 || .4 || .2 || .1 || 3.3
|-
| style="text-align:left;"|
| style="text-align:left;"|Boston
| 69 || 6 || 14.7 || .408 || .378 || .875 || 2.1 || .5 || .3 || .1 || 3.4
|-
| style="text-align:left;"|
| style="text-align:left;"|Boston
| 56 || 15 || 17.0 || .403 || .367 || .750 || 2.6 || .7 || .3 || .0 || 4.6
|-
| style="text-align:left;" rowspan="2"|
| style="text-align:left;"|Milwaukee
| 20 || 0 || 15.4 || .257 || .268 || .769 || 2.9 || .3 || .3 || .3 || 2.9
|-
| style="text-align:left;"|L.A. Clippers
| 10 || 0 || 9.8 || .414 || .444 || .813 || 1.6 || .4 || .2 || .1 || 4.1
|- class="sortbottom"
| style="text-align:center;" colspan="2"|Career
| 284 || 24 || 14.5 || .384 || .344 || .717 || 2.2 || .4 || .3 || .1 || 3.4

Playoffs

|-
| style="text-align:left;"| 2018
| style="text-align:left;"| Boston
| 17 || 3 || 13.5 || .303 || .273 || .857 || 1.6 || .1 || .2 || .0  || 1.9
|-
| style="text-align:left;"| 2019
| style="text-align:left;"| Boston
| 6 || 0 || 5.7 || .444 || .600 || 1.000 || .3 || .3 || .0 || .0 || 2.2
|-
| style="text-align:left;"| 2020
| style="text-align:left;"| Boston
| 13 || 0 || 9.4 || .350 || .217 || 1.000 || .9 || .1 || .2 || .0 || 1.6
|-
| style="text-align:left;"| 2021
| style="text-align:left;"| Boston
| 2 || 0 || 6.0 || .000 || .000 || .500 || .0 || .0 || .5 || .5 || .5
|- class="sortbottom"
| style="text-align:center;" colspan="2"| Career
| 38 || 3 || 10.5 || .284 || .264 || .846 || 1.1 || .1 || .2 || .1 || 1.8

College

|-
| style="text-align:left;"| 2013–14
| style="text-align:left;"| Duke
| 17 || 0 || 4.7 || .500 || .571 || .909 || .9 || .1 || .2 || .2 || 1.6
|-
| style="text-align:left;"| 2014–15
| style="text-align:left;"| Duke
| 6 || 0 || 10.5 || .278 || .250 || .571 || 2.3 || .2 || .5 || .0 || 3.0
|-
| style="text-align:left;"| 2016–17
| style="text-align:left;"| SMU
| 35 || 35 || 34.1 || .487 || .424 || .785 || 6.9 || 1.5 || .4 || .4 || 19.0
|- class="sortbottom"
| style="text-align:center;" colspan="2"|Career
| 58 || 35 || 23.1 || .479 || .415 || .785 || 4.6 || 1.0 || .4 || .3 || 12.3

References

External links
SMU Mustangs bio

1994 births
Living people
21st-century African-American sportspeople
African-American basketball players
American men's basketball players
American sportspeople of Nigerian descent
Basketball players from Kansas
Boston Celtics draft picks
Boston Celtics players
Duke Blue Devils men's basketball players
Los Angeles Clippers players
Parade High School All-Americans (boys' basketball)
Sportspeople from Overland Park, Kansas
Power forwards (basketball)
SMU Mustangs men's basketball players